Kedarnath Singh (7 July 1934 – 19 March 2018) was an Indian poet who wrote in Hindi. He was also an eminent critic and essayist. He was awarded the Jnanpith Award (2013), Sahitya Akademi Award (1989) in Hindi for his poetry collection, Akaal Mein Saras (Cranes in Drought).

Early life
He was born on 7 July 1934 in village Chakia of Ballia district(Bairia) in eastern Uttar Pradesh. He completed his graduation from Udai Pratap College, Varanasi. He passed M.A. from Kashi Hindu Vishwavidyalaya and did his Ph.D. from the same university. In Gorakhpur, he spent some time as a Hindi Teacher and went to Jawaharlal Nehru University, where he served as a professor and the head of department of Hindi Language in Indian Languages Center and retired as a professor from Jawaharlal Nehru University, New Delhi. He lived in New Delhi. He died on 19 March 2018 in Delhi.

Poetic style

Kedar Nath Singh's poetry is characterized by simple, everyday language and images that string together to convey complex themes. One of his major poems is Bagh, a long poem with the tiger as its central character. Published in the mid 1980s, the poem remains one of the most widely read long poems in Hindi literature and is included in many university curricula. At some level, Bagh bears a striking resemblance to Ted Hughes' Crow, but the two remain independent in their treatment and scope. “He was a poet of both presence and absence, of love and loss, of anxieties and questions...," said culture critic and poet Ashok Vajpayee.(5)

Major works

Poem Collection : Abhi Bilkul Abhi, Zameen pak Rahi Hai, Yahan se Dekho, Akaal mein Saaras, Baagh,Tolstoy aur cycle
Essay and Stories : Mere Samay ke Shabd,Kalpana aur chhayavad, Hindi kavita mein bimb vidhan, Kabristan mein Panchayat
Others :Taana Baana

Awards and honours
He received the Jnanpith award in 2013. He also received Sahitya Akademi award in 1989, the Kumaran Aashan, and the Vyas Award.

See also
 List of Indian writers

References

External links
 
 Kedarnath Singh at Kavita Kosh (Hindi)

1934 births
2018 deaths
Recipients of the Sahitya Akademi Award in Hindi
Recipients of the Gangadhar National Award
Indian male poets
Hindi-language writers
Hindi-language poets
Indian male essayists
Writers from Uttar Pradesh
People from Ballia district
Academic staff of Jawaharlal Nehru University
Recipients of the Jnanpith Award
20th-century Indian essayists
20th-century Indian poets
20th-century Indian male writers